Paul Scholes (born 16 November 1974) is an English football coach, pundit, former player, and co-owner of Salford City. He spent his entire professional playing career with Manchester United, for whom he scored over 150 goals in more than 700 appearances between 1993 and 2013. He is widely regarded as one of the best midfielders of his generation and one of the greatest Manchester United players of all time.

Scholes came through the Manchester United youth academy as one of Fergie's Fledglings, a group of players recruited by Manchester United under the management of Sir Alex Ferguson. Scholes made his full debut for Manchester United in the 1994–95 season. He went on to make 718 appearances for the club, the third-highest number of appearances by any player for the club. Scholes announced his retirement from playing in May 2011 and was appointed as a coach at Manchester United. He returned to playing in January 2012, and played one more season for the club before retiring again in May 2013. With Manchester United, Scholes won 25 trophies including 11 Premier League titles (more than any other English player) and two UEFA Champions League titles.

Scholes represented the England national team from 1997 to 2004, gaining 66 caps and participating in the 1998 and 2002 World Cups, as well as the UEFA Euro 2000 and Euro 2004 tournaments. Scholes announced his retirement from international football in August 2004, citing his family life and his club career with Manchester United as being more important.

Over his career Scholes has received praise from various managers and players, including Xavi, who said in 2014 that Scholes was "the best central midfielder" he had seen in the previous 15 to 20 years, describing him as "a spectacular player who has everything. He can play the final pass, he can score, he is strong, he never gets knocked off the ball and he doesn't give possession away." Pelé said, "If he was playing with me, I would have scored so many more." Thierry Henry cited Scholes as the greatest player in Premier League history. Scholes was named in the Premier League 10 Seasons Awards (1992–93 to 2001–02) Domestic & Overall Team of the Decade. In 2008, he was inducted into the English Football Hall of Fame.

His first managerial position was at Oldham Athletic, for 31 days in February and March 2019. In 2020, he had a short spell as interim manager of Salford City.

Early life
Scholes was born in Salford, Greater Manchester. On his mother's side, his grandmother came from Ireland while his grandfather was from Northern Ireland. The family moved to Langley, Greater Manchester, when he was 18 months old, where he lived on Bowness Road and Talkin Drive. He attended the St Mary's RC Primary School in Langley. The first team he played for was Langley Furrow. Scholes also excelled at cricket. At age 14, he began training with Manchester United. He later joined as a trainee upon leaving the Cardinal Langley Roman Catholic High School in Middleton during the summer of 1991. In his final term at school, he was selected to represent Great Britain National Schools in football.

Club career

1993–1999
Scholes was a member of the Manchester United youth team that reached the final of the FA Youth Cup in the 1992–93 season, alongside Phil Neville. Scholes turned professional on 23 July 1993 and was issued with the number 24 shirt, but did not make his breakthrough into the senior squad until the 1994–95 season, when he made seventeen league appearances and scored five goals.

His debut came on 21 September 1994, where he scored both goals in a 2–1 victory over Port Vale in the League Cup. His league debut came three days later against Ipswich Town at Portman Road, a game which United lost 3–2 and Scholes scored a consolation goal. He scored two league goals when he came on 10 December when United beat Queens Park Rangers 3–2 at Loftus Road. On 3 January 1995, he got onto the scoresheet at Old Trafford for the first time with the opener in a 2–0 league win over Coventry City. He scored once more that season, in a 3–2 away win over Coventry City on 1 May.

Scholes came on as a substitute in the 1995 FA Cup final against Everton, which United lost 1–0. He came close to scoring twice late in the game, only to be foiled by Neville Southall both times.

In 1995–96, after Mark Hughes moved to Chelsea, Scholes had more first-team opportunities, standing in for the suspended Eric Cantona as Andrew Cole's strike partner for the first two months of the campaign. Scholes scored 14 goals in all competitions as United became the first English team to win the double twice. He picked up another Premier League winners medal in 1996–97 – in this season he changed his shirt number to 18, which he held for the next 15 years.

In the 1996 close season, when United unsuccessfully tried to sign Alan Shearer from Blackburn Rovers, the Ewood Park club reportedly demanded that United should offer Scholes in exchange if any bid for Shearer from United was to be considered. By this stage, Scholes was rated at £5 million. Shearer, however, never came to Old Trafford, instead joining Newcastle United for £15 million.

After Roy Keane suffered a knee injury in late September 1997 and was ruled out for the rest of the season, Scholes was made a central midfielder in the 1997–98 season. United finished the season without a major trophy, only the second time in the 1990s that this happened.

In 1998–99, Scholes was a key player in Manchester United's Premier League title, FA Cup, and UEFA Champions League treble success. He scored one of Manchester United's two goals against Newcastle in the FA Cup final. He also scored an away goal against Inter Milan in the Champions League quarter-final. He came on as a substitute in the second leg of the semi final against Juventus as Sir Alex Ferguson opted for Nicky Butt in the starting line up. He picked up a yellow card which ruled him out of the final victory over Bayern Munich through suspension.

2000–2011
During the 1999–2000 season, Scholes scored one of the finest goals of his career against Bradford City on 25 March 2000. David Beckham took a corner directly to Scholes, who was standing on the edge of the area, who volleyed it in over Dwight Yorke, who was forced to duck. A week later, Scholes scored the first hat-trick of his United career against West Ham United in a 7–1 victory that put United ten points clear.

During the 2001–02 transfer window, United completed the signing of Argentine international Juan Sebastián Verón. In order to accommodate Scholes and Verón, Ferguson persisted with the 4–4–1–1 formation, with Scholes playing at the withdrawn striker role behind Ruud van Nistelrooy, as Roy Keane and Verón played in central midfield (CM). In European away fixtures, Scholes was often played in central midfield alongside Verón as Keane anchored.

Scholes netted a career-high 20 goals in all competitions in the 2002–03 season, including a hat-trick in a 6–2 win against Newcastle. a number that dipped to fourteen the next year. This was despite a career-best four FA Cup goals, in comparison to his total of five FA Cup goals scored in his first nine seasons.

Scholes scored the winning goal in the 2003–04 FA Cup semi-final against Arsenal, and played in the final which United won 3–0 against Millwall, his last FA Cup winners medal. He also played in the 2005 FA Cup Final, but saw his penalty saved by Jens Lehmann as they lost to Arsenal in a penalty shootout.

Scholes was ruled out for the second half of the 2005–06 campaign with blurred vision. The cause of this was initially uncertain, sparking fears that it could end his career. He overcame this problem through the beginning of the year and he appeared in United's final game of the season against Charlton Athletic.

On 22 October 2006, in the 2–0 victory over Liverpool, Scholes became the ninth United player to play in 500 matches, joining Bobby Charlton, Bill Foulkes and Ryan Giggs.

Scholes experienced one of his finest seasons in 2006–07, and was included in the PFA Team of the Year, and was shortlisted for the PFA Players' Player of the Year. One of his finest performances of the season came in a 4–1 win against Blackburn Rovers, where United were 1–0 down but Scholes "got hold of the game by the scruff of the neck" and scored the equalising goal. Scholes was dismissed during United's 1–0 away victory over Liverpool on 3 March 2007 for swinging an arm at Xabi Alonso. It marked his first league sending off since April 2005. A month later, he was sent off in the first leg of United's Champions League quarter-final at Roma.

Scholes suffered knee ligament damage during a training session the night before United's Champions League Group F match with Dynamo Kyiv on 23 October 2007, and was out of action until the end of January 2008. He returned as a substitute in United's 3–1 win over Tottenham Hotspur in the fourth round of the FA Cup. On 23 April 2008, Scholes made his 100th Champions League appearance in a 0–0 draw away to Barcelona in the semi-final first leg, and scored the only goal in a 1–0 victory in the second leg that sent United into the final. During the final against Chelsea, he suffered an injury and received a yellow card after a clash with Claude Makélélé; he was substituted in the 87th minute and did not take part in the penalty shoot-out, which United won 6–5 after drawing 1–1 after extra time. In the 2008 UEFA Super Cup against Zenit Saint Petersburg, Scholes was sent off after he received a second yellow card for a deliberate handball.

Scholes was inducted into the English Football Hall of Fame in September 2008.

On 22 April 2009, he made his 600th appearance for United in a 2–0 win over Portsmouth.

On 16 February 2010, Scholes scored his third Champions League goal of the season against Milan in a 3–2 win; it was also United's first away goal against Milan. This gave United their first away win over Milan and also made Scholes the first player to score against both Inter Milan and Milan at the San Siro in the Champions League. The goal against AC Milan was Scholes' 25th Champions League goal in total, and with 25 goals to his name, Scholes is the highest goal-scoring central midfielder in Champions League history. On 6 March 2010, Scholes became the 19th player in Premier League history to score 100 goals, and also the third United player after Ryan Giggs and Wayne Rooney to do so, in the 2009–10 season, netting the only goal in a 1–0 win over Wolverhampton Wanderers at Molineux Stadium. On 16 April 2010, Scholes signed a new one-year contract with United, keeping him at the club until the end of the 2010–11 season.

Scholes began the 2010–11 season strongly, displaying Man of the Match performances against Chelsea in the 2010 Community Shield on 8 August and eight days later in the opening fixture of the new league campaign against Newcastle United as he assisted two goals in a 3–0 home victory. Scholes scored his 150th goal for United in a 2–2 away draw against Fulham on 22 August; he was also awarded the Premier League Player of the Month for August 2010. In April 2011, Scholes was sent off for a high challenge on Pablo Zabaleta in the FA Cup semi-final against Manchester City; United went on to lose the fixture 1–0.

He announced his retirement on 31 May 2011, with immediate effect, and joined the coaching staff at Old Trafford.

On 5 August 2011, United held a testimonial match to honour his 17 years of service to the club. The match was played at Old Trafford against New York Cosmos. United won the match 6–0, with Scholes opening the scoring with a trademark strike from 25 yards, in front of a sell out 74,731 crowd.

2012–2013

Having been training with Manchester United's reserve team, Scholes' desire to play football returned and he approached Alex Ferguson and assistant manager Mike Phelan with a view to coming out of retirement, possibly for another club if they declined to have him back at United; however, the club had been going through an injury crisis in midfield, and on 8 January 2012, Scholes made his comeback as a substitute in a 3–2 win over neighbours Manchester City in the FA Cup. Since the number 18 shirt had been given to Ashley Young, Scholes wore the number 22 shirt. He made his first start in the next game against Bolton Wanderers, where he scored his first goal since returning in a 3–0 victory at Old Trafford, converting a Wayne Rooney pass; this meant he had scored at least one goal in every season in the Premier League since 1994–95. He scored his second goal since coming back in a 2–1 away win against Norwich City on 26 February, heading home a cross from Nani. On 8 April, he scored in a 2–0 win against Queens Park Rangers at Old Trafford, helping United to go eight points clear of rivals Manchester City in the Premier League.

On 30 May, Scholes signed a one-year extension with Manchester United, keeping him at the club until summer 2013. He marked his 700th appearance for Manchester United by scoring in a 4–0 win at home to Wigan Athletic on 15 September 2012. This goal meant that he had scored in his 19th consecutive Premier League season, a feat only surpassed by teammate Ryan Giggs, who holds the record of 21 consecutive seasons.

On 11 May 2013, Scholes announced that he would make his second and final retirement from football at the end of the season. Scholes made his 499th and final professional league appearance on 19 May 2013 against West Bromwich Albion as a substitute. During the game, Scholes earned his 97th Premier League yellow card, at the time the third most in the history of the Premier League behind Lee Bowyer (102) and Kevin Davies (101).

2018
In August 2018, Scholes briefly came out of retirement from football at the age of 43 and played a match for his son's team, Royton Town of the Manchester Football League Premier Division, against Stockport Georgians. Royton lost the fixture 1–0.

International career
Scholes made his international debut against South Africa in 1997 in a 2–1 friendly win at Old Trafford, and was included in the England squad for the 1998 World Cup. England were grouped with Colombia, Tunisia and Romania. During England's first World Cup group match against Tunisia, Scholes sealed a 2–0 victory with a goal late in the game.

His international career continued after England's elimination from the World Cup by Argentina on penalties in the first knock-out round. On 27 March 1999, Scholes managed a hat-trick for England in a game against Poland. In addition, Scholes scored both goals in England's 2–0 win at Hampden Park over Scotland in the Euro 2000 play-off first leg, sealing a 2–1 aggregate win and qualification for the finals tournament. In a qualifier against Sweden that June, Scholes became the first and last England player to be sent off in an international match at the old Wembley Stadium.

With the turn of the century, Scholes became a prominent player in England's midfield, becoming a first-choice selection for the 2002 World Cup. Immediately prior to Euro 2004, however, Scholes was played out of position on the left midfield to accommodate the pairing of Steven Gerrard and Frank Lampard in central midfield, starting on the left for the last five matches of his international career. Scholes announced his retirement from international football in August 2004, citing his family life and his club career with Manchester United as being more important.

Following the departure of England coach Sven-Goran Eriksson in 2006, there was speculation regarding Scholes making himself available for international duty again under new boss Steve McClaren. In October 2006, McClaren said that he had personally asked Scholes twice to rejoin England, but Scholes declined. In May 2010, McClaren's successor Fabio Capello approached Scholes about a return to international football in the run-up to the 2010 World Cup, but Scholes again rejected the offer, saying he would prefer to spend time with his family. On 7 June 2010, Scholes stated that if Capello had given him more time and asked earlier, he would have probably taken the opportunity. On 27 July 2010, Scholes expressed his disappointment in not taking the opportunity to play at another World Cup, saying he may have made a mistake.

Player profile

Style of play

Scholes was highly regarded for his technical skills, and renowned for his accurate passing, intelligent movement and powerful shooting from long range. Though he played mostly as a striker in his youth and early professional career, Scholes matured into a well-rounded, tenacious, and versatile playmaker capable of playing in any midfield position, often alternating between defensive, offensive, wide and playmaking roles, due to his stamina, vision, work-rate, and positional sense. Scholes was renowned for his late attacking runs and ability to combine with teammates, as well as an excellent capacity to read the game and control the tempo of play, which enabled him to function in a deep-seated creative role as well as in a box-to-box role in the centre of the pitch; he played in the centre for much of the earlier part of his career, while he was instead deployed in a deeper role in the later part of his career. Scholes possessed an extraordinary range of passing and frequently initiated dangerous attacking plays after winning back possession.

In an interview with FourFourTwo, Scholes admitted to not being blessed with notable pace or dribbling skills, and attributed his calmness and ability to retain possession under pressure to having a sharp brain, excellent awareness, and good link-up play. He was also used in a more advanced creative role on occasion, as a deep-lying forward behind an out-and-out striker. At international level, he was also occasionally used out of position on the left flank.

Reception

Many of his peers, including Zinedine Zidane and Edgar Davids, have spoken about their admiration for his talent. Former Brazil international Sócrates was quoted as saying, "He is good enough to play for Brazil. I love to watch Scholes, to see him pass, the boy with the red hair and the red shirt." Former France and Arsenal captain Thierry Henry said, "Without any doubt the best player in the Premiership has to be Scholes ... He knows how to do everything." When asked about Scholes, Bobby Charlton said, "Paul is always so in control and pin-point accurate with his passing – a beautiful player to watch," while Italian manager Marcello Lippi remarked that Scholes is "an all-round midfielder who possesses quality and character in abundance". In August 2010, BBC football pundit and former Liverpool defender Alan Hansen described Scholes as "one of the top three to five players to have ever played in the Premier League", and commented, "His passing, movement and technique set examples to everyone." Former Manchester United teammate Nani commented, "He's the best midfielder I've ever seen. He can pass, score goals with his left, right, his head – he can do anything." Another one of his former Manchester United teammates, Carlos Tevez, described Scholes as the best passer alongside whom he had ever played.

In February 2011, Barcelona midfielder Xavi rated Scholes as the best player in his position in the past two decades, stating, "A role model. For me, and I really mean this, he's the best central midfielder I've seen in the last 15, 20 years. He's spectacular, he has it all, the last pass, goals, he's strong, he doesn't lose the ball, vision. If he'd been Spanish he might have been rated more highly. Players love him." This sentiment was echoed by former Barcelona manager Pep Guardiola, who considered Scholes to be the best midfielder of his generation. The former Juventus and A.C. Milan midfielder, Andrea Pirlo, speaking ahead of the 2015 UEFA Champions League Final, further elaborated on his admiration for Scholes, "I have been so fortunate to have played with so many incredible players throughout my career, but if I could pick one that I never got the chance to play with, it would be Paul Scholes. One of the all-time greats. A genius on the field, but private – no circus around him off it. I have a lot of respect for him." Gareth Southgate said, "You've got very good players and then there are top players. In my time in the England setup, Paul Gascoigne, Paul Scholes and [Wayne] Rooney just had that little bit more than all the others. And we are talking high‑level people there, players like Steven Gerrard, Frank Lampard and David Beckham."

Many, including Scholes' national teammates, have said that he was one of the few English players capable of "pulling the strings" in midfield, dictating the flow of game where England often have been criticised for being nervous on the ball and giving away possession.

Match discipline
Scholes received frequent criticism for his discipline, particularly regarding his tackling, which was questioned as frequently inept by multiple pundits, fans and Scholes himself. In addition, the potential for malicious intent in some of his tackles has been raised; it has been suggested that he has escaped greater censure due to the admiration that many have for the rest of his game.

Scholes has been criticised for his disciplinary record, amassing the fifth-most yellow cards in Premier League history with 97, and also receiving four red cards. He has also been booked 32 times in the Champions League, surpassed only by Sergio Ramos. Arsenal manager Arsène Wenger criticised Scholes' tackling, stating, "For me he was not a fair player. There's a little bit of a darker side in him, sometimes, that I did not like. I respect him highly as a quality player but I did not like some things he did on the football pitch." Scholes said in a BBC Radio 5 Live interview that he was not a bad tackler, but that, "If someone got me early in the game, it was always in the back of my mind that I needed to get them back", and suggested that the bookings he received towards the end of his career were influenced by his reputation.

Football ownership and coaching career

In 2014, it was announced that Scholes, along with fellow Manchester United legends Gary Neville, Ryan Giggs, Nicky Butt, and Phil Neville, had agreed a deal to purchase Salford City ahead of the 2014–15 season. with plans to get the club to the Football League. The group announced they would take part in a special friendly, with Salford facing a Class of '92 team. On 22 September, the group agreed to sell a 50% stake in the club to billionaire Peter Lim.

Having previously informally helped out Nicky Butt with the Manchester United under-19 team during the first half of the 2013–14 season, Scholes agreed to join the United first-team coaching staff on a temporary basis after the sacking of David Moyes until the end of the season as a favour to friend and former teammate Ryan Giggs, following the latter's appointment as interim player-manager on 23 April 2014.

In January 2015, Scholes and Phil Neville were caretaker managers of Salford for a 2–1 win over Kendal Town, between the dismissal of Phil Power and appointment of Anthony Johnson and Bernard Morley.

On 19 November 2017, Scholes and his old teammate, Ryan Giggs, were invited to join in training works for PVF Football Academy in Vietnam. With Ryan Giggs, who was chosen to be a development director, Scholes worked as a technical advisor.

On 11 February 2019, Scholes was appointed as manager of League Two side Oldham Athletic, having been cleared to take the position by the English Football League in light of his ownership of Salford City. On 14 March, Scholes resigned as manager, having won once in his seven games, following interference from club owner Abdallah Lemsagam in first team affairs.

On 12 October 2020, Scholes was appointed interim head coach of Salford City, following the departure of Graham Alexander. Scholes' first game in charge was a 1–0 defeat to Port Vale on 17 October, and he quickly ruled out taking the position on a permanent basis, citing the need for a more experienced manager. His first win came three days later with a 3–0 win against struggling Southend United. Scholes left the role on 4 November 2020, following the permanent appointment of Richie Wellens to the post.

Outside football

Media career
In July 2014, Scholes became a pundit after signing a four-year deal with BT Sport. He would also be featuring on ITV's coverage of Champions League and England internationals. Scholes previously made an appearance for Sky Sports as a pundit during the 2013–14 season. In August, he agreed to become a columnist for The Independent. Scholes has been praised for his passionate and no nonsense style of punditry.

Endorsements
Scholes featured in EA Sports' FIFA video game series; he was on the cover for the international edition of FIFA 2001, and was named in the Ultimate Team Legends for FIFA 17.

Scholes has endorsed sportswear company Nike and appeared in Nike commercials. In a global Nike advertising campaign in the run-up to the 2002 World Cup in Korea and Japan, he starred in a "Secret Tournament" commercial (branded "Scorpion KO") directed by Terry Gilliam, appearing alongside football players such as Thierry Henry, Ronaldo, Edgar Davids, Fabio Cannavaro, Francesco Totti, Ronaldinho, Luís Figo and Hidetoshi Nakata, with former player Eric Cantona the tournament "referee".

University Academy 92
Along with other United players who won the 1992 FA Youth Cup, Scholes has proposed a university in Greater Manchester, named University Academy 92 which would offer "broader courses than traditional degrees" and attract students who "otherwise might not go on to higher education".

Personal life

Scholes is asthmatic, and suffered from Osgood–Schlatter disease (a knee condition that affects young athletes). He married his childhood sweetheart, Claire (née Froggatt), in Wrexham, Wales, in February 1999. They live in the village of Grasscroft in Greater Manchester, and have a daughter and two sons, the younger of whom has autism. He is of Irish and Northern Irish descent.

His off-field personality is said by some to be in stark contrast to the attitude of the stereotypical professional footballer. Roy Keane once highlighted that Scholes did not like the "celebrity bullshit" side of professional sports. With regard to his shunning of celebrity, and instead keeping to his intention to solely focus on doing his job ("a professional footballer"), Keane applauded Scholes after his retirement.

Scholes is known to enjoy betting on football. In June 2019, he was fined and warned over his future conduct by The Football Association (FA) after placing bets worth £26,159 on matches during his time as a director of Salford City. At a tribunal, he was found to have placed 140 bets over three-and-a-half years, in contravention of the FA's gambling rules. The FA fined Scholes £8,000 and asked him to contribute to the costs of the tribunal.

In an interview given before Euro 2004, Scholes described his ideal day as "train in the morning, pick up my children from school, play with them, have tea, put them to bed and then watch a bit of TV". Scholes has always liked a quiet life outside of football.

Career statistics

Club

International
Appearances and goals by national team and year

England score listed first, score column indicates score after each Scholes goal

Managerial statistics

Honours
Manchester United
Premier League: 1995–96, 1996–97, 1998–99, 1999–2000, 2000–01, 2002–03, 2006–07, 2007–08, 2008–09, 2010–11, 2012–13
FA Cup: 1995–96, 1998–99, 2003–04
Football League Cup: 2008–09, 2009–10
FA Charity/Community Shield: 1996, 1997, 2003, 2008, 2010
UEFA Champions League: 1998–99, 2007–08
Intercontinental Cup: 1999
FIFA Club World Cup: 2008

England U18
UEFA European Under-18 Championship: 1993

Individual
Jimmy Murphy Young Player of the Year: 1992–93
Premier League Player of the Month: January 2003, December 2003, October 2006, August 2010
Premier League PFA Team of the Year: 2002–03, 2006–07
Premier League 10 Seasons Awards (1992–93 to 2001–02)
Domestic & Overall Team of the Decade
English Football Hall of Fame Inductee: 2008
Premier League 20 Seasons Awards (1992–93 to 2011–12)
Fantasy Teams of the 20 Seasons (Panel & Public choice)
Premier League Hall of Fame: 2022
FWA Tribute Award: 2012

See also
 List of footballers with 100 or more UEFA Champions League appearances
 List of one-club men in association football
 List of athletes who came out of retirement

Notes

References

External links

Official club profile at ManUtd.com

In-depth profile from The Guardian

1974 births
Association football coaches
Living people
People from Middleton, Greater Manchester
Footballers from Salford
English footballers
Association football midfielders
Manchester United F.C. players
Premier League players
UEFA Champions League winning players
FA Cup Final players
English Football Hall of Fame inductees
England youth international footballers
England international footballers
1998 FIFA World Cup players
UEFA Euro 2000 players
2002 FIFA World Cup players
UEFA Euro 2004 players
English football managers
Manchester United F.C. non-playing staff
Salford City F.C. chairmen and investors
Salford City F.C. managers
Oldham Athletic A.F.C. managers
People associated with University Academy 92
English people of Irish descent
English people of Northern Ireland descent
Premier League Hall of Fame inductees